Ishmael Pole (born 25 January 1993) is a Papua New Guinean footballer who plays as a goalkeeper for Hekari United.

References

External links

Living people
1993 births
Papua New Guinea international footballers
Papua New Guinean footballers
Association football goalkeepers
People from the Southern Highlands Province
2016 OFC Nations Cup players